The American Association of Colleges and Universities (AAC&U) is a global membership organization headquartered in Washington, D.C., United States. It works to improve quality and equity in undergraduate education and advance liberal education. Founded in 1915, AAC&U comprises more than 1,000 member institutions in the US and abroad, including accredited public and private colleges, community colleges, research universities, and comprehensive universities.

Publications
AAC&U publishes Liberal Education magazine, sponsors meetings and institutes for campus teams and publishes reports and monographs.

The Multi-State Collaborative to Advance Quality Student Learning
The Multi-State Collaborative to Advance Quality Student Learning is a collaboration led by the AAC&U and the state higher education executive officers. As of October 2016, the project involved 900 faculty members at 80 public two- and four-year institutions in 13 states. The project aims to produce a cross-institutional method of evaluating student learning by getting faculty from different institutions to agree on a set of general education outcomes by using a common rubric, the AAC&U Value Rubrics, for evaluating student work. The leaders of this collaboration hope that results of the project will “paint an accurate picture of learning nationwide and, in turn, spark continuing improvement. The notability of the project is its “subject of analysis: the authentic stuff of college – the homework, problem sets, and papers that students regularly produce.”

References 

College and university associations and consortia in the United States
1915 establishments in the United States
Organizations established in 1915